Alvydas Duonėla (born 27 June 1976 in Skuodas) is a Lithuanian sprint canoer. He won seven medals at the ICF Canoe Sprint World Championships with three golds (K-2 200 m: 2001, 2002, 2003), two silvers (K-2 200 m: 2005, K-2 500 m: 2001), and two bronzes (K-2 500 m: 2003, 2005).

Duonėla also competed in three Summer Olympics, earning his best finish of seventh twice (K-1 500 m: 2000, K-2 500 m: 2004).

Duonėla is 190 cm / 6'3 tall and weighs 89 kg / 196 lbs. He is a member of the Žalgiris Canoe Club in Vilnius. He lists his interests as music and rallying.

References

1976 births
Canoeists at the 2000 Summer Olympics
Canoeists at the 2004 Summer Olympics
Canoeists at the 2008 Summer Olympics
Lithuanian male canoeists
Living people
Olympic canoeists of Lithuania
People from Skuodas
Sportspeople from Vilnius
ICF Canoe Sprint World Championships medalists in kayak